After the Fireworks: Three Novellas (1936) is a collection of three of Aldous Huxley's earlier published novellas in separate short story volumes:
 "After the Fireworks" (1930).  Originally published as part of Brief Candles.
 "Two or Three Graces" (1926).  Originally published as part of Two or Three Graces.
 "Uncle Spencer" (1924).  Originally published as part of Little Mexican.

References

Short story collections by Aldous Huxley